Cristina is a female given name, and it is also a surname. Notable people with the name include:

Given name
Cristina (daughter of Edward the Exile), 11th-century English princess
Cristina (singer), Cristina Monet-Palaci (1956–2020), American singer
Infanta Cristina of Spain (born 1965), Spanish princess
Cristina D'Avena (born 1964), Italian singer and actress
Cristina Bazgan, French computer scientist
Cristina Boiț (born 1968), Romanian discus thrower
Cristina Bowerman, Italian chef
Cristina Butucea, French statistician
Cristina Cini (born 1969), Italian football assistant referee
Cristina Conati, Italian and Canadian computer scientist
Cristina Deutekom (1931–2014), Dutch opera singer
Cristina Dorcioman (born 1974), Romanian football referee
Cristina Fernández de Kirchner (born 1953), President of Argentina
Cristina Fink (born 1964), Mexican high jumper
Cristina Gallardo-Domâs, Chilean soprano
Cristina Lasvignes (born 1978), Spanish television and radio broadcaster
Cristina Narbona (born 1951), Spanish Minister of Environment
Cristina Odone (born 1960), Italian journalist, editor, and writer
Cristina Perez (judge) (born 1964), American TV judge
Cristina Pérez (reporter) (born 1973), Argentine television news journalist
Cristina Pucelli (born 1969), American voice actress
Cristina Rosato (born 1983), Canadian actress
Cristina Saralegui (born 1948), host of the Univision talk show El Show de Cristina
Cristina Scabbia (born 1972), Italian singer, vocalist of Lacuna Coil
Cristina Scarlat (born 1981), Moldovan singer
Cristina Stenbeck (born 1977), Swedish businesswoman
Cristina García-Orcoyen Tormo (born 1948), Spanish politician and environmentalist
Cristina Torrens Valero (1974), Spanish professional tennis player
Cristina Zenato (born 1971), Italian shark diver

Surname
Albert Cristina (born 1970), Dutch volleyball player
Dolores Cristina (born 1949), Maltese Minister of Education, Employment and Family

Fictional 
Cristina Rosales, from the novel trilogy The Dark Artifices by Cassandra Clare
Cristina Yang, from the TV series Grey's Anatomy

See also
Princess Christina (disambiguation)
Cristiana

Filipino feminine given names  
Italian feminine given names
Romanian feminine given names
Spanish feminine given names
Portuguese feminine given names